Wolfgang Horak (born 2 May 1952) is a German rower. He competed in the men's coxless four event at the 1976 Summer Olympics.

References

1952 births
Living people
German male rowers
Olympic rowers of West Germany
Rowers at the 1976 Summer Olympics
Sportspeople from Bonn